Schattschneider is a surname, and may refer to;
Arnold Schattschneider (1869–1930), German musician and pedagogue
Clemens Schattschneider (b. 1992), Austrian Snowboard World Cup competitor
Dirk Schattschneider, North Rhine-Westphalian state representative to Europa-Union Deutschland
Doris Schattschneider (b. 1939), American mathematician
Elmer Eric Schattschneider (1892–1971), American political scientist
Erika Schattschneider-Kollnig, German astronomer, namesake of asteroid 1402 Eri
Julio Guilherme Schattschneider, Brazilian federal judge — see Desembargador
Peter Schattschneider (b. 1950), Austrian physicist and writer